Sodium benzoate is the sodium salt of benzoic acid, widely used as a food preservative (with an E number of E211) and a pickling agent. It appears as a white crystalline chemical with the formula C6H5COONa.

Production
Sodium benzoate is commonly produced by the neutralization of sodium hydroxide (NaOH) with benzoic acid (C6H5COOH), which is itself produced commercially by partial oxidation of toluene with oxygen.

Natural occurrence
Many foods are natural sources of benzoic acid, its salts, and its esters. Fruits and vegetables can be rich sources, particularly berries such as cranberry and bilberry. Other sources include seafood, such as prawns, and dairy products.

Uses

As a preservative
Sodium benzoate can act as a food preservative. It is most widely used in acidic foods such as salad dressings (for example acetic acid in vinegar), carbonated drinks (carbonic acid), jams and fruit juices (citric acid), pickles (acetic acid), condiments, and frozen yogurt toppings. It is also used as a preservative in medicines and cosmetics. Under these conditions it is converted into benzoic acid (E210), which is bacteriostatic and fungistatic. Benzoic acid is generally not used directly due to its poor water solubility.
Concentration as a food preservative is limited by the FDA in the U.S. to 0.1% by weight. Sodium benzoate is also allowed as an animal food additive at up to 0.1%, per the Association of American Feed Control Officials.
Sodium benzoate has been replaced by potassium sorbate in the majority of soft drinks in the United Kingdom.

Sodium benzoate was one of the chemicals used in 19th century industrialised food production that was investigated by Dr. Harvey W. Wiley with his famous 'Poison Squad' as part of the US Department of Agriculture. This led up to the 1906 Pure Food and Drug Act, a landmark event in the early history of food regulation in the United States.

In pharmaceuticals
Sodium benzoate is used as a treatment for urea cycle disorders due to its ability to bind amino acids. This leads to excretion of these amino acids and a decrease in ammonia levels. Recent research shows that sodium benzoate may be beneficial as an add-on therapy (1 gram/day) in schizophrenia. Total Positive and Negative Syndrome Scale scores dropped by 21% compared to placebo.

Sodium benzoate, along with phenylbutyrate, is used to treat hyperammonemia.

Sodium benzoate, along with caffeine, is used to treat postdural puncture headache, respiratory depression associated with overdosage of narcotics, and with ergotamine to treat vascular headache.

Other uses
Sodium benzoate is also used in fireworks as a fuel in whistle mix, a powder that emits a whistling noise when compressed into a tube and ignited.

Mechanism of food preservation
The mechanism starts with the absorption of benzoic acid into the cell. If the intracellular pH falls to 5 or lower, the anaerobic fermentation of glucose through phosphofructokinase decreases sharply, which inhibits the growth and survival of microorganisms that cause food spoilage.

Health and safety 

In the United States, sodium benzoate is designated as generally recognized as safe (GRAS) by the Food and Drug Administration. The International Programme on Chemical Safety found no adverse effects in humans at doses of 647–825 mg/kg of body weight per day.

Cats have a significantly lower tolerance against benzoic acid and its salts than rats and mice.

The human body rapidly clears sodium benzoate by combining it with glycine to form hippuric acid which is then excreted. The metabolic pathway for this begins with the conversion of benzoate by butyrate-CoA ligase into an intermediate product, benzoyl-CoA, which is then metabolized by glycine N-acyltransferase into hippuric acid.

Association with benzene in soft drinks & pepper sauces

In combination with ascorbic acid (vitamin C, E300), sodium benzoate and potassium benzoate may form benzene. In 2006, the Food and Drug Administration tested 100 beverages available in the United States that contained both ascorbic acid and benzoate. Four had benzene levels that were above the 5 ppb Maximum Contaminant Level set by the Environmental Protection Agency for drinking water. Most of the beverages that tested above the limit have been reformulated and subsequently tested below the safety limit. Heat, light and shelf life can increase the rate at which benzene is formed. Hot peppers naturally contain vitamin C ("nearly as much as in one orange") so the observation about beverages applies to pepper sauces containing sodium benzoate, like Texas Pete.

ADHD and Hyperactivity
Research published, including in 2007 for the UK's Food Standards Agency (FSA) suggests that certain artificial colors, when paired with sodium benzoate, may be linked to hyperactive behavior and other ADHD symptoms. The results were inconsistent regarding sodium benzoate, so the FSA recommended further study. The Food Standards Agency concluded that the observed increases in hyperactive behavior, if real, were more likely to be linked to the artificial colors than to sodium benzoate. The report's author, Jim Stevenson from Southampton University, said: "The results suggest that consumption of certain mixtures of artificial food colours and sodium benzoate preservative are associated with increases in hyperactive behaviour in children. . . . Many other influences are at work but this at least is one a child can avoid."

Compendial status
 British Pharmacopoeia
 European Pharmacopoeia
 Food Chemicals Codex
 Japanese Pharmacopoeia
 United States Pharmacopeia

See also
 Acceptable daily intake
 List of investigational antipsychotics
 Potassium benzoate

References

External links

  International Programme on Chemical Safety - Benzoic Acid and Sodium Benzoate report

 Safety data for sodium benzoate 
 The Ketchup Conundrum

Antiseptics
Benzoates
Preservatives
Organic sodium salts
E-number additives